is a retired Japanese cyclist.

Major results

2005
1st Prologue Tour de Hokkaido
2006
1st Prologue Tour de Hokkaido
3rd Team time trial, Asian Games
2008
 Tour de Hokkaido
1st Stages 2 & 3
2009
1st Team time trial, East Asian Games (with Makoto Iijima, Kazuo Inoue and Hayato Yoshida)
1st  Time trial, National Road Championships
3rd Overall Tour de Hokkaido
1st Stage 2
2010
1st Tour of South China Sea
2011
1st Tour de Okinawa

References

External links

1982 births
Living people
Japanese male cyclists
Asian Games medalists in cycling
Cyclists at the 2006 Asian Games
Cyclists at the 2010 Asian Games
Asian Games bronze medalists for Japan
Medalists at the 2006 Asian Games